St. Augustine's Seminary is the archdiocesan seminary of the Roman Catholic Archdiocese of Toronto, and is located by the shore of Lake Ontario in Scarborough. It is a member of the Toronto School of Theology.

History
St. Augustine's Seminary was established in 1913 to train diocesan priests. The land on which the Seminary was built was previously that of farmer and Anglican Adna Pherrill (1816-1892). Its construction was funded entirely by Eugene O'Keefe, a wealthy Toronto brewer and philanthropist who died months before its completion.

The Beaux-Arts architecture structure is topped off with a copper clad dome. The architect was Arthur W. Holmes who designed numerous buildings in Toronto, such as St. Patrick's Church, Holy Name Church as well as St. Michael's College, part of the University of Toronto. He modelled the college chapel on the refectory of Queen's College, Oxford.

In 1969 the Toronto School of Theology was created as an independent federation of 7 schools of theology, including the divinity faculties of St. Augustine's Seminary. Within its own federation, University of Toronto granted all but theology or divinity degrees. Since 1978, by virtue of a change made in its charter, the university has granted theology degrees conjointly with St. Augustine's Seminary and other Toronto School of Theology member institutions.

A nearby building that had housed classes but had fallen into disuse has been rented by St. John Henry Newman Catholic High School, since the high school's inception in 1973.

Architects Bogdan Newman Caranci Inc. were responsible for performing an assessment of the building's condition, which was followed by a restoration project.

Mission
St. Augustine's Seminary is the Major Seminary of the Roman Catholic Archdiocese of Toronto. It also welcomes candidates from elsewhere. Although the main goal is the preparation of candidates for ordained priesthood in the Catholic Church the seminary also prepares men and women aspiring to other ministries in the Church.

Programs
St. Augustine Seminary and Institute of Theology offer the following programs which combine spiritual formation, theological education and field training:
 Pontifical Baccalaureate of Sacred Theology (STB) and Master of Divinity (M.Div.)
 Master of Theological Studies (MTS)
 Master of Religious Education (MRE)
 Diploma programs in Theological Studies and Diploma in Lay Ministry
 Philosophy program

Residence
St. Augustine Seminary provides residence for candidates to the priesthood. Other students live in off-campus housing.

Burial Grounds

A list of notables buried at St. Augustine:

 Fergus Patrick McEvay, Archbishop of Toronto
 Neil McNeil, Archbishop of Toronto
 James Charles McGuigan, Archbishop of Toronto
 John Edward McCarthy, S.F.M

See also

Higher education in Ontario
St. John Henry Newman Catholic High School

References

External links
 St. Augustine's Seminary

Educational institutions established in 1913
Catholic seminaries
Catholic Church in Ontario
Seminaries and theological colleges in Canada
Universities and colleges in Toronto
Education in Scarborough, Toronto
Burials at St. Augustine's Seminary
Beaux-Arts architecture in Canada
1913 establishments in Ontario